William VIII of Jülich, Count of Ravensberg ( – 22 November 1428) was the youngest son of William VII of Jülich, 1st Duke of Berg and Anna of the Palatinate.

Along with his brother, Adolf, William rebelled against his father but surrendered in 1404 and received his father's title as Count of Ravensberg which he held until his death in 1428.

In 1401, William was appointed Bishop of Paderborn by Pope Boniface IX through the influence of his uncle, Rupert, King of Germany.  William's elder brother Rupert had held the same post from 1389–1394.  Like his uncle, King Rupert, William was a follower of the Roman Popes.  As Prince-Bishop, William aroused heavy unrest with his ecclesiastical reform effort and quarreled with Waldeck and Lippe, compelling acknowledgement of Paderborn's sovereignty over parts of Lippe.  Despite territorial policy successes, he faced opposition and renounced Paderborn in 1414.  He attempted to become Archbishop of Cologne but failed against Dietrich of Moers who also replaced William as Bishop of Paderborn.  William then married Dietrich's niece, Adelheid of Tecklenburg, and became the father of the new line of the Dukes of Jülich-Berg and Counts of Ravensberg, when his brother Adolf died without an heir.  William and Adelheid are buried in the Stiftskirche in Bielefeld.

Family and children 
On 19 February 1416, William married Adelheid of Tecklenburg, daughter of Nicholas II, Count of Tecklenburg and Elisabeth of Moers.  They had one son:

 Gerhard (c. 1416–1475), married Sophie of Saxe-Lauenburg, daughter of Bernard II, Duke of Saxe-Lauenburg

Ancestry

References

External links 
 genealogie-mittelalter.de

1428 deaths
Roman Catholic bishops of Paderborn
Year of birth uncertain
William VIII
William